Paul Philibert was a politician in Quebec, Canada.  He served as a Member of the National Assembly (MNA) from 1985 to 1994.

Background

He was born on September 10, 1944 in Saint-Élie, Mauricie.

Political career

He ran as a Liberal candidate in the district of Trois-Rivières in 1981, but lost against PQ incumbent Denis Vaugeois.

After Vaugeois resigned in 1985, Philibert won a by-election in the same district.  He was re-elected six months later against newly appointed Cabinet Member Rollande Cloutier and was re-elected in 1989.  He served as a Parliamentary Assistant from 1985 until the 1994 election in which he was defeated by PQ candidate Guy Julien.

Footnotes

1944 births
Living people
Quebec Liberal Party MNAs